Fredericksburg is an unincorporated community in Mahoning County, in the U.S. state of Ohio.

History
A variant name was Frederick. A post office called Frederick was established in 1834, and remained in operation until 1900. The original town site was inundated by the waters of the Lake Milton reservoir.

References

Unincorporated communities in Mahoning County, Ohio
1834 establishments in Ohio
Populated places established in 1834
Unincorporated communities in Ohio